Sierra Popoluca, also known as Soteapanec, Soteapan Zoque, or Highland Popoluca, is a developing Mixe-Zoquean language of the Zoquean branch. It has 35,050 speakers (INALI, 2009) who live in the southern part of Veracruz, Mexico. Sierra Popoluca has two sister languages, Texistepec and Ayapanec, both of which are severely endangered.

The word popoluca means "gibberish” in Nahuatl, and the name Sierra Popoluca comes from the language being labelled as such at the time of conquest. To avoid the derogatory connotations of popoluca, some researchers have adopted the name Soteapanec for the language instead (named after the largest municipality it is spoken in). However, modern speakers do not seem to be concerned with the history of the word and simply see it as the name of their language. Natively, speakers refer to the language as Nuntajɨyi, which means "true word," and themselves as Nundajɨypappɨc.

Distribution 
Sierra Popoluca is spoken in the following municipalities:

 Soteapan
 Tatahuicapan
 Hueyapan de Ocampo

Other communities where it is spoken include Catemaco, Piedra Labrada, and Santa Rosa Cintepec. Nahuatl and Spanish are also spoken in nearby areas, and have influenced Sierra Popoluca through language contact.

Writing system 
Two Sierra Popoluca spellings have been developed, one by the SIL international and another by the Academia Veracruzana de las Lenguas Indígenas.

With the AVELI spelling, the long vowels are represented by doubling the letter, the glottal stop is represented by the apostrophe.

With the spelling of SIL, long vowels are represented with a macron below the letter and the glottal stop is indicated with the acute accent on the vowel which precedes it, except when it is between two vowels or at the end of word.

Phonology

Vowels 
Sierra Popoluca has twelve vowel phonemes: six distinct short vowels (front vowels /i/ and /ɛ/, central vowels /ɘ/ and /a/, and back vowels /u/ and /ɔ/) with a corresponding long vowel for each.

Consonants 
Sierra Popoluca's consonant inventory consists of thirteen consonants.

Some words in Sierra Popoluca contain "an unspecified underlying segment, identified as the segment /H/." Depending on the environment it appears in, /H/ can alternate in three different ways, as described by the rules below:

In addition to its main consonant inventory, Sierra Popoluca also has a restricted phoneme inventory consisting of eleven consonants. These consonants are considered "restricted" because the only words they appear in are either ideophones, Spanish borrowings, or stylistic alterations.

Syllable structure 
Sierra Popoluca's syllabic template is (C)CV(ː)(ʔ)(C)(C). Words containing examples of each syllable structure are given in the table below:

Sierra Popoluca has phonotactic restrictions on both onset and coda clusters. For onsets, only the clusters /tr/, /kr/, and /kw/ are allowed. For codas, all two consonant clusters must begin with one of /p, k, ʔ/, and three consonant clusters are restricted to only /ʔps/ and /ʔks/.

Stress 
There are three degrees of stress in Sierra Popoluca: primary stress (which may fall on the penultimate or ultimate syllable), secondary stress (which is assigned to the leftmost syllable that is not a clitic), and tertiary stress (which falls on the heaviest syllable preceding primary stress). Words containing examples of each stress paradigm are given in the table below:

Morphology
Sierra Popoluca is an agglutinating, polysynthetic language whose morpheme inventory is primarily inflectional and consists of roughly an equal number of clitics and suffixes, with no prefixes. The morphological processes reduplication and compounding are also observed in Sierra Popoluca.

Sierra Popoluca has three major word classes: nouns, verbs, and adjectives.

Suffixes 
Sierra Popoluca has 28 suffixes, all of which can be categorized as either derivational, inflectional, or valency adjusting. Nouns only take derivational suffixes whereas verbs take suffixes from all three categories. Examples of each suffix type are given in the table below:

Proclitics 
There are 17 proclitics in Sierra Popoluca. Out of these, ten are used for person marking, three are used for valency adjusting, two are derivational, and the final two have other, unique functions. Verbs in Sierra Popoluca can take all proclitic types while nouns can take all but valency adjusting proclitics. Examples of various proclitics are given in the table below:

Enclitics 
Sierra Popoluca has nine enclitics, six of which are adverbial, two of which are inflectional, and one of which is a relativizer. Nouns can take all three types of enclitic whereas verbs can only take adverbial enclitics. Examples of each enclitic type are given in the table below:

Reduplication 
Reduplication of the root (full reduplication) is observed with both nouns and verbs in Sierra Popoluca, and can be inflectional or derivational. Though generally used to convey intensity or frequency, reduplication can also express "a sense of wandering around repeating an action" when paired with the ambulative suffix -ʔoʔy. Various examples of reduplication are given in the table below:

Compounding 
Compounding is observed in all word classes in Sierra Popoluca and is highly productive. Various examples of compound words are given in the table below:

Syntax 
Sierra Popoluca is an ergative-absolutive, head-marking language. At minimum, the basic clause can consist of just a predicate, as shown below:At maximum, it can include an inflected complex predicate and up to three modified arguments:

Basic word order 
Word order in Sierra Popoluca is pragmatically determined for the most part. In transitive sentences, all six possible word orders are attested, as shown below:

    VSO
    VOS
    SVO
    SOV
    OVS
    OSV

In intransitive sentences, both possible word orders are attested:

    SV    VSHowever, not all word orders are used with equal frequency; an analysis of over 4,000 clauses from various texts found the following distribution of word orders in transitive and intransitive sentences:

Distribution of Word Orders by Transitivity

Relative word order 
In terms of relative word order, Sierra Popoluca exhibits some structural features common to VO (verb initial) languages and some common to OV (verb final) languages. A few examples of these structures are given below:

 Possessor precedes possessum (common to OV languages)

 Auxiliary verb precedes main verb (common to VO languages)

 Complementizer precedes complement clause (common to VO languages)

Order of nominal modifiers 
Nouns in Sierra Popoluca can be modified by determiners, adjectives, quantifiers, possessors, and relative clauses. Whether a modifier precedes or follows the noun it is modifying depends on the modifier, as illustrated below:
 Demonstratives precede the nouns they modify

 Adjectives precede the nouns they modify

 Relative clauses may either precede or follow the nouns they modify

Recordings 
Sierra Popoluca Collection of Lynda Boudreault from the Archive of the Indigenous Languages of Latin America. Contains 148 archival files, including audio recordings and transcripts from a wide range of genres.

Further reading
Kaufman, Terrence. 2016a. Soteapan Gulf Sokean Ethnobotanical Terminology. Project for the Documentation of the Languages of Mesoamerica.
Kaufman, Terrence. 2016b. Soteapan Gulf Sokean Ethnozoological Terminology. Project for the Documentation of the Languages of Mesoamerica.

References

Indigenous languages of Mexico
Mesoamerican languages
Mixe–Zoque languages

Languages of Mexico